Johnson County is a county in the U.S. state of Illinois. According to the 2010 census, it has a population of 12,582. Its county seat is Vienna. It is located in the southern portion of Illinois known locally as "Little Egypt".

History

Johnson County was organized in 1812 out of Randolph County. It was named for Richard Mentor Johnson, who was then a U.S. Congressman from Kentucky. In 1813, Johnson commanded a Kentucky regiment at the Battle of the Thames, after which he claimed to have killed Tecumseh in hand-to-hand combat. Johnson went on to become Vice President of the United States.

Geography

Climate and weather

Major highways
  Interstate 24
  Interstate 57
  U.S. Route 45
  Illinois Route 37
  Illinois Route 146
  Illinois Route 147
  Illinois Route 166

Transit
 List of intercity bus stops in Illinois

Adjacent counties
 Williamson County - north
 Saline County - northeast
 Pope County - east
 Massac County - southeast
 Pulaski County - southwest
 Union County - west

National protected areas
 Cypress Creek National Wildlife Refuge (part)
 Shawnee National Forest (part)

Demographics

2010
Whereas, according to the 2010 U.S. Census Bureau:
 89.0% White
 8.0% Black
 0.2% Native American
 0.2% Asian
 0.0% Native Hawaiian or Pacific Islander
 1.0% Two or more races
 1.6% Other races
 3.0% Hispanic or Latino (of any race)

2010
As of the 2010 United States Census, there were 12,582 people, 4,584 households, and 3,270 families residing in the county. The racial makeup of the county was 89.0% white, 8.0% black or African American, 0.2% Asian, 0.2% American Indian, 1.6% from other races, and 1.0% from two or more races. Those of Hispanic or Latino origin made up 3.0% of the population. In terms of ancestry, 17.6% were German, 11.5% were Irish, 10.9% were English, and 6.5% were American.

Of the 4,584 households, 28.8% had children under the age of 18 living with them, 59.2% were married couples living together, 8.3% had a female householder with no husband present, 28.7% were non-families, and 25.3% of all households were made up of individuals. The average household size was 2.41 and the average family size was 2.85. The median age was 42.2 years.

The median income for a household in the county was $41,619 and the median income for a family was $47,423. Males had a median income of $48,047 versus $30,904 for females. The per capita income for the county was $16,402, the lowest of all 102 counties in Illinois and 57th in the U.S. About 11.1% of families and 13.6% of the population were below the poverty line, including 19.0% of those under age 18 and 10.7% of those age 65 or over.

Communities

Cities
 Marion (mostly in Williamson County)
 Vienna

Villages
 Belknap
 Buncombe
 Cypress
 Goreville
 New Burnside
 Simpson

Unincorporated communities

 Bloomfield
 Crossroads
 Dixon Springs
 Elvira
 Ganntown
 Grantsburg
 Ozark
 Parker City
 Pleasant Grove
 Pond
 Reevesville
 Reynoldsburg
 Tunnel Hill
 West Vienna
 White Hill

Politics
In its early days Johnson County, being strongly Southern in its culture, was fiercely Democratic. In fact, in the 1860 Presidential election the county gave Illinois native and Northern Democrat Stephen A. Douglas a higher proportion of its votes than any other county in the United States.

However, during the Civil War, under the influence of Congressman John Logan, this region of dubious initial loyalty was to provide a number of Union soldiers rivalled on a per capita basis only by a few fiercely Unionist counties in Appalachia.

This level of Union service has meant that despite its historic hostility towards Yankee culture, Johnson County has been powerfully Republican ever since the Civil War. Douglas in 1860 remains the last Democrat to win a majority of the county's vote: the solitary Democratic victory since was by Bill Clinton in 1992 and was due to Ross Perot taking many votes from Republican incumbent George HW Bush.

Education
School districts include:

K-12:
 Century Community Unit School District 100
 Goreville Community Unit School District 1
 Marion Community Unit School District 2

Secondary:
 Vienna High School District 133

Elementary:
 Buncombe Consolidated School District 43
 Cypress School District 64
 New Simpson Hill Consolidated District 32
 Vienna School District 55

See also
 National Register of Historic Places listings in Johnson County, Illinois

References

Further reading
 P.T. Chapman, A History of Johnson County, Illinois. Herrin, IL: Press of the Herrin News, 1925.

 
Illinois counties
1812 establishments in Illinois Territory
Populated places established in 1812
Johnson County, Illinois
Pre-statehood history of Illinois